The 1904 George Washington Hatchetites football was an American football team that represented George Washington University as an independent during the 1904 college football season. In their first season under head coach Alexander Rorke, the team compiled a 4–2–2 record.

Schedule

References

George Washington
George Washington Colonials football seasons
George Washington Hatchetites football